European Soul is the second studio album by British indie rock band Citizens!. It was released in April 2015 under Kitsuné.

Track list

References

2015 albums